James William Short (1909 – after 1935) was an English professional footballer who played as a forward in the Football League for Sheffield Wednesday, Brighton & Hove Albion and Barrow. He also played non-league football for clubs including Jarrow, South Shields, Walker Celtic and Middle Dock.

References

1909 births
Year of death missing
People from Bedlington
Footballers from Northumberland
English footballers
Association football forwards
Jarrow F.C. players
Sheffield Wednesday F.C. players
Brighton & Hove Albion F.C. players
Barrow A.F.C. players
South Shields F.C. (1936) players
Walker Celtic F.C. players
English Football League players